Bo Kuangyi (born 17 December 1987), more commonly known as Bo Guagua, is the second son of former Chinese politician Bo Xilai and the only child of Gu Kailai, his father's second wife.

Biography 
Bo attended Harrow School, read PPE at Oxford University, and studied for a master's degree at Harvard University.

In 2016, Bo, graduated from Columbia Law School, with a Juris Doctor degree.

Because his father was a high-ranking Chinese Communist Party (CCP) official, Bo Guagua's life has been an occasional topic of news media gossip, which intensified, and gained considerable international attention when his father was removed from office in March 2012.

Both his parents came under investigation in the alleged homicide of family friend, Neil Heywood, who also reportedly helped Bo during his time in the UK.

Bo's father is often described as a "princeling" (offspring of CCP elite); his lifestyle, and privileges typify those of fuerdai, and far exceed those of regular Chinese people of his age.

As of December 2019 he was living in Canada and working for the Power Corporation for two and a half years as a business analyst. This corporation is owned by the Desmarais family, who have maintained close ties to the Bo family for three generations.

Early life and education

Family 
Bo's father, Bo Xilai, was a high-profile CCP official and Politburo member until his removal from office in 2012. His paternal grandfather, Bo Yibo, was a prominent revolutionary leader and one of the Eight Elders of the CCP.

Bo's mother is Gu Kailai. She is a lawyer who also hails from a prominent family; her father Gu Jingsheng, was a Communist revolutionary. Her mother Fan Chengxiu was a descendant of the renowned Song dynasty prime minister and poet Fan Zhongyan. Gu is the second wife of Bo Xilai.

Bo has a half brother "Brendan" Li Wangzhi (李望知), from his father's first marriage to Li Danyu. Brendan obtained his master's degree from Columbia University's School of International and Public Affairs in 2003.

Life in the UK 
At the age of 12 Bo began studying at Papplewick School in England, then went on to Harrow School. Bo was the first Chinese citizen to attend Harrow.

He attended Balliol College, Oxford, where he studied Philosophy, Politics and Economics. He had an active social life and in his second year he ran unsuccessfully for a prominent position in the Oxford Union, a debating society. Bo struggled in his academic work and was required to sit further exams to maintain his grades. According to classmates, Bo failed the exams and was "rusticated" (suspended) for one year. Three Chinese diplomats went to see Dr Andrew Graham, the Master of Balliol College, and sought to have the rustication revoked, explaining that Bo's academic probation would be a source of embarrassment to his father and grandfather in China. The request to reinstate Bo was denied. The following year, Bo achieved "respectable marks" during his final exams, according to The New York Times, and passed with a 2:1 degree (upper second class honours) overall, having obtained first class honours in Philosophy. Notwithstanding, The New York Times asserted that Bo's tutors declined to provide him with recommendations for his application to Harvard.

After his suspension at Oxford, Bo reportedly lived in a luxury flat at the Randolph Hotel. A front-page story in The Wall Street Journal alleged that he was seen stepping out of a red Ferrari wearing a tuxedo in early 2011 at the residence of then-U.S. ambassador Jon Huntsman Jr. This anecdote was later challenged by The New York Times, which reported that Huntsman's daughter had been picked up by the function's organisers, while Bo had arrived at the function in a chauffeur-driven Audi, and was not wearing a tuxedo. Bo organised trips to China for his classmates and invited Jackie Chan to appear at a function at Oxford. During his time at Oxford, Bo was featured in the Chinese edition of Esquire.

Bo's university directory page with Oxford describes him as the founder of the Guagua Internet Company, which isn’t well known.

Education in the United States
He was ultimately admitted to the Masters program in public policy at its Kennedy School of Government, from which he graduated in May 2012. He enrolled in Columbia Law School beginning Fall 2013.

Personal life

Funding controversies
After his father was stripped of all official titles by the Chinese Communist Party, there was much public speculation about how he was able to go to private schools in the UK and the US on his father's salary of $20,000 per year. The private Harrow School he attended costs $48,000 per year; then Oxford University's tuition alone costs about $25,000 per year; Harvard University's Kennedy School requires about $70,000 a year for both tuition and living expenses. Bo's three-year course at Columbia, one of the most expensive law schools in the United States charges tuition and other fees of more than $60,000 a year, on top of which living expenses have to be factored in.

The Wall Street Journal reported that he was living at a luxury apartment in Cambridge, Massachusetts at a monthly cost of approximately $2,600. He was also reported to drive a $80,000 black Porsche sports car, having collected violations for running stop signs in December 2010 and May 2011, and for speeding in February 2012.

On 24 April 2012, Harvard University school newspaper, The Harvard Crimson, published a statement by Bo, in which he stated that his tuition and living expenses were "funded exclusively by two sources—scholarships earned independently, and my mother's generosity from the savings she earned from her years as a successful lawyer and writer." He denied that he had ever driven a Ferrari. On the other hand, his father told the Chinese news media that his son was on full scholarship and his wife was a successful lawyer, but she was afraid of people spreading rumors, so she closed down her law office a long time ago. At the trial of Bo Xilai that started on 22 August 2013, businessman Xu Ming testified that he paid for Bo Guagua's travel and credit card bills, although during cross-examination Bo Xilai challenged many of the payments.

Public image
Bo's lifestyle was the subject of gossip and public interest, both internationally and within China, in the 2010s, and it led to the coining of a new verb – "to guagua", which, according to The Independent, alludes to his charm, wealth, and abundant political connections. Bo's lifestyle was in stark contrast to his father's efforts to revive a "red culture" movement in Chongqing, which included the singing of revolutionary songs and promotion of Maoist slogans. The conspicuous consumption and privilege of the children of Chinese leaders such as Bo Guagua is a source of widespread resentment within China. Unlike some children of party leaders who maintain a low profile, Bo cultivated an unusually public persona. When Bo Xilai was suspended from his party positions, party leaders listed the younger Bo's behavior as one of the causes. Bo's lifestyle as a playboy, having been widely circulated in the international press, is widely suspected of being an embarrassment to Communist Party leadership in Beijing,  who have made it known that they are eager for him to return to China to face prosecution for corruption.

References

Bo Xilai family
1987 births
Living people
Alumni of Balliol College, Oxford
Chinese expatriates in the United States
Columbia Law School alumni
Chinese computer businesspeople
Harvard Kennedy School alumni
People educated at Harrow School
People educated at Papplewick School